Maqna'a Al-Alla is a sub-district located in al-Nadirah District, Ibb Governorate, Yemen. Maqna'a Al-Alla had a population of 5257 according to the 2004 census.

References 

Sub-districts in An Nadirah District